The India women's national cricket team toured South Africa in 2001–02, playing one Test match and four women's One Day Internationals.
South Africa won the ODI series by 2–1 and India won the only Test match played between the sides.

One Day International series

1st ODI

2nd ODI

3rd ODI

4th ODI

Test series

Only Test

References

2002 in South African cricket
2002 in women's cricket
2002 in South African women's sport
2001–02 South African cricket season
Women
2002 in Indian cricket
International cricket competitions in 2001–02
March 2002 sports events in Africa
Women's international cricket tours of South Africa